27a-35a Dalgety Road, Millers Point are heritage-listed terrace houses located at 27a, 29a, 31a, 33, 35a Dalgety Road, in the inner city Sydney suburb of Millers Point in the City of Sydney local government area of New South Wales, Australia. The property is also known as Dalgety Terrace and Dalgety Terraces. It was added to the New South Wales State Heritage Register on 2 April 1999.

History 
Millers Point is one of the earliest areas of European settlement in Australia, and a focus for maritime activities. These are a group of early twentieth century workman's terraces built  as part of the post plague redevelopment by the Sydney Harbour Trust. First tenanted by the NSW Department of Housing in 1986.

Description 

These large terraces feature elaborate timber verandahs with ornamental brackets in the Federation style. Also, they have teracotta Marsailles roofs. The terrace consists of a two bedroom units on both the ground floor and the first floor. The stairs leading to the upper units are generally shared by two units, with the entry to the lower units directly to the sides of them. Storeys: Two; Construction: Facebrick walls, tiled roof, timber verandah and balustrading. Style: Federation.

The external condition of the property is good.

Heritage listing 
As at 23 November 2000, this terrace is one of a group of early twentieth century workmen's terraces built as part of the post plague redevelopment.

It is part of the Millers Point Conservation Area, an intact residential and maritime precinct. It contains residential buildings and civic spaces dating from the 1830s and is an important example of 19th century adaptation of the landscape.

27a-35a Dalgety Road, Millers Point was listed on the New South Wales State Heritage Register on 2 April 1999.

See also 

Australian residential architectural styles
15-25 Dalgety Road, Millers Point

References

Bibliography

Attribution

External links

 

New South Wales State Heritage Register sites located in Millers Point
Federation style architecture
Terraced houses in Sydney
Articles incorporating text from the New South Wales State Heritage Register
1911 establishments in Australia
Houses completed in 1911
Millers Point Conservation Area